The Geeste is a river in northwestern Germany, running through Lower Saxony and Bremen. It is the most downstream tributary of the River Weser and joins it near Bremerhaven. The Geeste rises in Hipstedt (Geestequelle - literally "Geeste springs") in the district of Rotenburg (Wümme) ten kilometres west of Bremervörde and drains a large part of the old district of Wesermünde (now Cuxhaven).

Despite its name, only the upper reaches of the Geeste flow through geest, the rest flows through marshland. The navigable length of the Geeste is 25 kilometres and is the westernmost section of the Elbe-Weser Shipping Channel. The Geeste forms wide meanders in its lower reaches and, in the area of Bremerhaven there are still three river bends of the original five.

Just before the mouth of the Geeste is a storm surge barrier beneath the Kennedy Bridge, which was completed in 1961 – just in time for the North Sea flood of 1962. Without the barrier part of Bremerhaven would have been flooded 'from behind' over the low dykes of the Geeste. An estimate of the flood damage which would have been caused if the Geeste barrier in Bremerhaven owned/built by EGA Essen had failed projected the number of inhabitants who would have been affected as 10,860 at a cost of about 1,837 million euros and probable flood damage of about 247 million euros. This roughly  250 million euros would probably not have been covered by insurance because the flooding would have been a consequence of a storm surge, which counts as an act of God.

Until the merger of the district of Wesermünde in 1932, the Geeste formed the boundary between the districts of Lehe and Geestemünde.

See also
List of rivers of Lower Saxony
List of rivers of Bremen

Notes 

Rivers of Lower Saxony
Rivers of Bremen (state)
Rivers of Germany